Calumpang may refer to:

 Calumpang, Marikina, a barangay in the Philippines
 Calumpang River, in Batangas, Philippines
 Sterculia foetida, a wild almond tree common in rural areas of the Philippines